Bonnet Carré Spillway Bridge may refer to:
 I-10 Bonnet Carré Spillway Bridge
 CNR Bonnet Carré Spillway-McComb Bridge
 U.S. 61 Bonnet Carré Spillway Bridge
 Kansas City Southern Bonnet Carré Spillway Bridge
 CNR Bonnet Carré Spillway-Baton Rouge Bridge